NIDS can refer to:
 National Institute for Discovery Science
 Network intrusion detection system, a system that tries to detect malicious activity by monitoring network traffic
 Neuroleptic-induced deficit syndrome, a clinical syndrome that develops in some patients receiving too high doses of an antipsychotic for too long time
 NAS (National Airspace System) Integrated Display System (IDS), a display system used in air traffic control towers and terminal radar approach control 

 NIDS is most known for the Skinwalker Ranch case
 Tyranids, Warhammer 40,000